Fathabad may refer to:

Alborz Province
Fathabad, Alborz, a village in Nazarabad County

Chaharmahal and Bakhtiari Province
Fathabad, Chaharmahal and Bakhtiari, a village in Shahrekord County

East Azerbaijan Province
Fathabad, East Azerbaijan, a village in Tabriz County

Fars Province
Fathabad, Arsanjan, a village in Arsanjan County
Fathabad, Darab, a village in Darab County
Fathabad, Fasa, a village in Fasa County
Fathabad-e Deh-e Arab, a village in Firuzabad County
Fathabad, Jahrom, a village in Jahrom County
Fathabad, Kavar, a village in Kavar County
Fathabad, Kazerun, a village in Kazerun County
Fathabad, Jereh and Baladeh, a village in Kazerun County
Fathabad, alternate name of Banaruiyeh, a city in Larestan County
Fathabad-e Sofla, Marvdasht, a village in Marvdasht County
Fathabad, Neyriz, a village in Neyriz County
Fathabad, alternate name of Karzin, a city in Qir and Karzin County
Fathabad-e Olya, a village in Shiraz County
Fathabad-e Sofla, Shiraz, a village in Shiraz County
Fathabad Rural District (Fars Province), in Qir and Karzin County

Golestan Province 
Fathabad, Golestan, a city in Kalaleh County

Hamadan Province
Fathabad, Hamadan, a city in Tuyserkan County

Ilam Province
Fathabad, Ilam, a city in Darreh Shahr County

Isfahan Province
Fathabad, Kashan, a village in Kashan County
Fathabad, Semirom, a village in Semirom County

Kerman Province
Fathabad, Esmaili, a village in Anbarabad County
Fathabad, Hoseynabad, a village in Anbarabad County
Fathabad, Arzuiyeh, a village in Arzuiyeh County
Fathabad, Baft, a village in Baft County
Fathabad Rural District (Kerman Province), an administrative subdivision in Baft County
Fathabad, Fahraj, a village in Fahraj County
Fathabad, Kuhbanan, a village in Kuhbanan County
Fathabad, Rafsanjan, a village in Rafsanjan County
Fathabad, Ferdows, Rafsanjan, a village in Rafsanjan County
Fathabad, Rudbar-e Jonubi, a village in Rudbar-e Jonubi County
Fathabad, Dehaj, a village in Shahr-e Babak County
Fathabad, Madvarat, a village in Shahr-e Babak County
Fathabad, Sarbanan, a village in Zarand County
Fathabad, Vahdat, a village in Zarand County
Fathabad, Yazdanabad, a village in Zarand County
Fathabad-e Shur, a village in Zarand County
Fathabad-e Yazdanabad, a village in Zarand County

Kermanshah Province
Fathabad Rural District (Kermanshah Province), an administrative subdivision of Qasr-e Shirin County

Khuzestan Province
Fathabad, Andika, a village in Andika County

Kurdistan Province
Fathabad, Kurdistan, a village in Bijar County

Lorestan Province
Fathabad, Borujerd, a village in Borujerd County
Fathabad, Khorramabad, a village in Khorramabad County
Fathabad, Selseleh, a village in Selseleh County
Fattahabad, Lorestan, a village in Delfan County
Rig Sefid, Zagheh, a village in Khorramabad County

Markazi Province
Fathabad, Khomeyn, a village in Khomeyn County
Fathabad, Komijan, a village in Komijan County

North Khorasan Province
Fathabad, North Khorasan, a village in Esfarayen County

Qazvin Province
Fathabad, Qazvin, a village in Buin Zahra County

Qom Province

Razavi Khorasan Province
Fathabad, Bardaskan, a village in Bardaskan County
Fathabad, Chenaran, a village in Chenaran County
Fathabad-e Now, a village in Jowayin County
Fathabad, Mahvelat, a village in Mahvelat County
Fathabad, Mashhad, a village in Mashhad County
Fathabad-e Gorgha, a village in Mashhad County
Fathabad-e Yazdiha, a village in Mashhad County
Fathabad, Miyan Jolgeh, a village in Nishapur County
Fathabad, Zeberkhan, a village in Nishapur County
Fathabad, Quchan, a village in Quchan County
Fathabad, Shirin Darreh, a village in Quchan County
Fathabad, Sudlaneh, a village in Quchan County
Fathabad, Rashtkhvar, a village in Rashtkhvar County
Fathabad, Torbat-e Heydarieh, a village in Torbat-e Heydarieh County

South Khorasan Province
Fathabad, Boshruyeh, a village in Boshruyeh County
Fathabad, Ferdows, a village in Ferdows County
Fathabad, Qaen, a village in Qaen County
Fathabad, Tabas, a village in Tabas County

Tehran Province
Fathabad, Pishva, a village in Pishva County
Fathabad, Rey, a village in Rey County

West Azerbaijan Province
Fathabad, West Azerbaijan, a village in Shahin Dezh County

Yazd Province
Fathabad, Khatam, a village in Khatam County
Fathabad Rural District (Khatam County)
Fathabad, Mehriz, a village in Mehriz County
Fathabad, Taft, a village in Taft County